A pie iron—also called pudgy pie iron, sandwich toaster, snackwicher, toastie maker, that consists of two hinged concave, round or square, cast iron or aluminium plates on long handles. Its "clamshell" design resembles that of a waffle iron, but without that appliance's honeycomb pattern. Pie irons are used to heat, toast and seal the sandwich.

Name
The most common type in most countries are electrically heated counter-top models, and names vary from place to place. In the United Kingdom, the pie iron is referred to as a "toastie maker" or "toasted sandwich maker"; in Australia and South Africa, it may be called a "jaffle iron", "jaffle maker".

Origins
In the U.S., the Tostwich is possibly the earliest toasted sandwich maker, dating back to before 1920. However, it was not patented until 3 March 1925 (applied for on 26 May 1924). It was invented by Charles Champion, whose other inventions include a corn-popping machine for the mass production of popcorn.

The original Jaffle brand jaffle iron was designed and patented in 1949 by Dr Earnest Smithers from Bondi, Australia.

Operation
Modern versions of the pie-iron are commonly more domestic, if not necessarily more refined, with subdivisions  allowing pairs of bread slices to be clamped together around fillings to form pockets or stuffed sandwiches. A combination of heat and pressure seals the bread at the outer edges.

Campfire versions are still made of cast iron and can be cooked over coals, open flames, or a stove, but lightweight aluminium stove-top versions are made, generally being coated with a non-stick surface both as a cleaning aid and to allay fears regarding aluminium in the diet. 

Once the device is hot, the sandwich can be assembled "inside-out", where the buttered side of the bread faces outwards against the metal plates and the filling sits inside. This produces a crunchier toastie and helps prevent the bread from sticking. Alternatively, bread can be placed inside unbuttered, which produces a chewier toastie.

Regional variants

Rights acquired by John O'Brien for Australian cookware company Breville in the 1970s mean that the name Breville is sometimes used there eponymously to describe both the device and the toasted, sealed sandwich product. 
In the UK, the appliance is notorious for being little-used. A survey in 2005 suggested that 45% of British adults own, but do not use, sandwich toasters.
In India, open flame toasters are used to toast sandwiches. They are often called "Bombay sandwiches" in Mumbai.

See also
Croque monsieur
Cuban sandwich
Panini
Toast sandwich
Toaster
Waffle iron

References

Cooking appliances
20th-century inventions
American inventions
Australian inventions